Coffee is a widely consumed beverage.

Coffee may also refer to:

Geography
 Coffee, Georgia, an unincorporated community in Georgia, United States
 Coffee City, Texas, a town in the United States
 Coffee County (disambiguation), several counties in the United States
 Coffee Crater, British Columbia, Canada
 Coffee Creek (disambiguation), creeks and communities in Canada and the United States
 Coffee Precinct, Wabash County, Illinois, United States
 Coffee Road, a supply trail cut in southern Georgia, United States, in the early 1820s, much of which are now paved and  still in use
 Coffee Swamp, Wisconsin, United States
 Isle aux Herbes, also known as Coffee Isle, a state-owned barrier island located in the Mississippi Sound south of downtown Bayou la Batre, Alabama United States

People
 Coffee (surname)
 Coffee Johnny, nickname of English blacksmith John Oliver (1829-1900), immortalised in the folk song "Blaydon Races"

Music
 "Coffee" (Miguel song), a 2015 song by Miguel
 "Coffee" (Kelly Rowland song), a 2020 song by Kelly Rowland
 "Coffee (Give Me Something)", a 2020 song by Tiësto and Vintage Culture
 "Coffee", the Arabian Dance from The Nutcracker
 "Coffee", a song by Aesop Rock from the 2007 album None Shall Pass
 "Coffee", a song by BTS from the 2013 album O!RUL8,2?
 "Coffee", a song by Sylvan Esso from the 2014 album Sylvan Esso
 "Coffee", a 2017 song by beabadoobee
"The Coffee Song", first performed in 1946 by Frank Sinatra
 "The Coffee Cantata, an alternative name for "Schweigt stille, plaudert nicht, BWV 211" by Johann Sebastian Bach

Organizations and institutions
 Centre of Full Employment and Equity (CofFEE), a research centre at the University of Newcastle, Australia
 Coffee Correctional Facility, a privately operated, medium-security prison for men in Nicholls, Coffee County, Georgia
 Coffee High School (disambiguation)
 Coffee Regional Medical Center, Douglas, Georgia

Other uses
 Coffee (color)
 Coffee#1, a coffee house chain
 COFFEE (Cinema 4D), a computer scripting language
 Coffee, a filename extension for the CoffeeScript programming language
 one of the lions used as Leo the Lion (MGM)
 Ethiopian Coffee FC, a football club based in Addis Ababa, Ethiopia
 Café (2014 film), also known as Coffee, a Mexican documentary
 Coffee (2022 film), an Indian Marathi-language film
Coffee (2022 Tamil film), an Indian Tamil-language film

See also
 COFEE, the Computer Online Forensic Evidence Extractor, a tool kit for computer forensic investigators
 Coffea, a genus of flowering plants, several species of which provide the seeds for the popular beverage of coffee
 Coffey (disambiguation)
 Coffy (disambiguation)
 Koffee (born 2000), Jamaican singer